Ten Tigers of Canton or Ten Tigers of Guangdong refers to a group of ten Chinese martial artists from Guangdong Province lived around the 19th century during the Qing dynasty in China. They were said to be the greatest fighters in Guangdong during the Qing era. Much of their existence has been embellished by folk legends and stories passed down from generation to generation.

Ten Tigers' martial arts
The Ten Tigers of Canton traced their martial arts lineage to the Southern Shaolin Monastery 南少林寺 in the Jiulian Mountains 九連山 in Fujian Province 福建省. Southern Shaolin Kung Fu is a branch of the better known Shaolin Monastery 少林寺 on Mount Song 嵩山 in Henan Province 河南省. As such, the Ten Tigers' martial arts styles resemble those of Shaolin Kung Fu 少林武功.

Ten Tigers of Canton

Wong Yan-lam
Wong Yan-lam or Wang Yinlin, also romanised as Wong Yein-lam, was a student of the Tibetan monk Xinglong, a master of the "Lion's Roar" style of martial arts. Wong mastered this style, which later split into the Hop Family Fist, Lama Style, and White Crane Fist (Tibetan White Crane 西藏白鶴拳).

Wong Ching-ho
Wong Ching-ho or Huang Chengke, also romanised as Wong Cheng-ho, was a student of Luk Ah-choi. He is portrayed in popular fiction as specialising in the Nine Dragons Fist.

So Hak-fu
So Hak-fu or Su Heihu, also romanised as Sou Hark-fu, was a student of the Shaolin monk Zhaode 少林僧人兆德. He was trained in the Southern Shaolin Style but later created his own style, which is known as Black Tiger Style.

Wong Kei-ying
Wong Kei-ying or Huang Qiying, also romanised as Wong Khei-yin, was a student of Luk Ah-choi. He is best known for his skill in Hung Gaof which he was one of the progenitors. He also was the father of Wong Fei-hung 黃飛鴻, who wasn't one of the Ten Tigers but is sometimes referred to as the Tiger after the Ten Tigers.

Lai Yan-chiu
Lai Yan-chiu or Li Renchao was a practitioner of the Hakka Fist, which was also known as Southern Praying Mantis. He was also known for his skill in the Seven Stars Fist.

So Chan
So Chan or Su Can was a Hung Ga practitioner. He was famous for his skill in Drunken Fist and Shaolin Staff. He is more commonly known by his nickname "So Hut-yee" or "Su Qi'er", which means "Beggar So". Like Wong Fei-hung 黃飛鴻, he is also regarded as a folk hero in Chinese popular culture and has been the subject of films such as King of Beggars (1992) and True Legend (2010). He also appeared as a supporting character in some movies about Wong Fei-hung, most notably Drunken Master (1978).

Leung Kwan
Leung Kwan or Liang Kun was primarily known as one of the progenitors of Hung Ga but practiced the uncategorized southern shaolin style. He was known for his skill in the Iron Wire Fist. He is more commonly known by his nickname "Iron Bridge Three" because of the extraordinary strength he acquired through the practice of the iron wire fist.

Chan Cheung-tai
Chan Cheung-tai or Chen Changtai specialised in the martial art Iron Finger. He was nicknamed "Iron Finger Chan".

Tam Chai-kwan
Tam Chai-kwan or Tan Jijun was a practitioner of the Huadu 花都省 style of Hung Ga 洪家拳 and Tam Ga. He was nicknamed "Three Legs Tam" for the three types of kicks he used.

Chau Tai
Chau Tai or Zhou Tai, also romanised as Jau Taai and Chow Thye, was known for his "soft-hand" techniques and his mastery of the long staff. He created the martial art Zhou Family Bagua Staff, who has been passed down for generations in his family. He was also a master of Choy Li Fut 蔡李佛, which he integrated into his other martial arts styles. His descendants, Hung Chau (great-grandson) and Michael Chau (great-great-grandson), reside in San Francisco, California, United States.

Cultural references

Film
The Ten Tigers first appeared in the 1978 film Ten Tigers of Shaolin produced by Mei Lam Film Production Company.

The Ten Tigers appeared in the 1979 Hong Kong film Ten Tigers from Kwangtung produced by the Shaw Brothers Studio. It featured a star-studded cast of Shaw Studio actors, including the Venom Mob, Ti Lung and Alexander Fu.

A fictionalized version of the Ten Tigers were featured in the 2004 film Around the World in 80 Days, with Sammo Hung making a special appearance as Wong Fei-hung. Wong and the Ten Tigers assisted the protagonists in liberating the village of Lanzhou.

Television
In 1999, Hong Kong's ATV produced a 40-episodes TV drama series titled Ten Tigers of Guangdong.

Literature
In The Eleventh Tiger, a BBC Books original novel by David A. McIntee, the Ten Tigers are featured, with Wong Kei-ying and Wong Fei-hung as major characters in the story.

Music
The electronic music artist Bonobo has a track called "Ten Tigers" on his 2013 album The North Borders.

References

Buddhist folklore
Chinese martial artists
Chinese warriors
Cantonese folklore
Chinese folklore
Qing dynasty people
Sportspeople from Guangdong